The Custos Rotulorum of Leitrim was the highest civil officer in County Leitrim.

Incumbents

1684–1700 Sir William Gore, 3rd Baronet
1769–1777 Nathaniel Clements
1795–1854 Nathaniel Clements, 2nd Earl of Leitrim (died 1854) 

For later custodes rotulorum, see Lord Lieutenant of Leitrim

References

Leitrim